Mühlbauer or Muehlbauer or Muhlbauer is a German language occupational surname for a "mill builder" and may refer to:
Anke Mühlbauer (1968), German diver
Beatriz Futuro Muhlbauer (1986), Brazilian rugby sevens player
Dan Muhlbauer (1958–2020), American politician
Holger Mühlbauer (1964), German jurist and writer
Sepp Mühlbauer, Swiss ski jumper

References 

German-language surnames
Occupational surnames